İskele District is a district of the de facto state of Northern Cyprus. It is divided into three sub-districts: İskele Sub-district, Mehmetçik Sub-district and Yialousa Sub-district. Its capital is Trikomo, also known by its Turkish name, İskele. Its population was 23.098 in the 2011 census. Its Governor is Bünyamin Merhametsiz.

The district was separated from Gazimağusa District in 1998.

Gallery

References

 
Districts of Northern Cyprus